Ubiquitin carboxy-terminal hydrolase L1 (ubiquitin C-terminal hydrolase, UCH-L1) is a deubiquitinating enzyme.

Function 

UCH-L1 is a member of a gene family whose products hydrolyze small C-terminal adducts of ubiquitin to generate the ubiquitin monomer. Expression of UCH-L1 is highly specific to neurons and to cells of the diffuse neuroendocrine system and their tumors. It is abundantly present in all neurons (accounts for 1-2% of total brain protein), expressed specifically in neurons and testis/ovary.

The catalytic triad of UCH-L1 contains a cysteine at position 90, an aspartate at position 176, and a histidine at position 161 that are responsible for its hydrolase activity.

Relevance to neurodegenerative disorders 
A point mutation (I93M) in the gene encoding this protein is implicated as the cause of Parkinson's disease in one German family, although this finding is controversial, as no other Parkinson's disease patients with this mutation have been found.

Furthermore, a polymorphism (S18Y) in this gene has been found to be associated with a reduced risk for Parkinson's disease. This polymorphism has specifically been shown to have antioxidant activity.

Another potentially protective function of UCH-L1 is its reported ability to stabilize monoubiquitin, an important component of the ubiquitin proteasome system. It is thought that by stabilizing the monomers of ubiquitin and thereby preventing their degradation, UCH-L1 increases the available pool of ubiquitin to be tagged onto proteins destined to be degraded by the proteasome.

The gene is also associated with Alzheimer's disease, and required for normal synaptic and cognitive function. Loss of Uchl1  increases the susceptibility of pancreatic beta-cells to programmed cell death, indicating that this protein plays a protective role in neuroendocrine cells and illustrating a link between diabetes and neurodegenerative diseases.

Patients with early-onset neurodegeneration in which the causative mutation was in the UCHL1 gene (specifically, the ubiquitin binding domain, E7A) display blindness, cerebellar ataxia, nystagmus, dorsal column dysfunction, and upper motor neuron dysfunction.

Ectopic expression 

Although UCH-L1 protein expression is specific to neurons and testis/ovary tissue, it has been found to be expressed in certain lung-tumor cell lines. This abnormal expression of UCH-L1 is implicated in cancer and has led to the designation of UCH-L1 as an oncogene.
Furthermore there is evidence that UCH-L1 might play a role in the pathogenesis of membranous glomerulonephritis as UCH-L1 de novo expression in podocytes was seen in PHN, the rat model of human mGN.
This UCH-L1 expression is thought to induce at least in part podocyte hypertrophy.

Protein structure 

Human UCH-L1 and the closely related protein UCHL3 have one of the most complicated knot structure yet discovered for a protein, with five knot crossings.  It is speculated that a knot structure may increase a protein's resistance to degradation in the proteasome.

The conformation of the UCH-L1 protein may also be an important indication of neuroprotection or pathology. For example, the UCH-L1 dimer has been shown to exhibit the potentially pathogenic ligase activity and may lead to the aforementioned increase in aggregation of α-synuclein. The S18Y polymorphism of UCH-L1 has been shown to be less-prone to dimerization.

Interactions 

Ubiquitin carboxy-terminal hydrolase L1 has been shown to interact with COP9 constitutive photomorphogenic homolog subunit 5.

UCH-L1 has also been shown to interact with α-synuclein, another protein implicated in the pathology of Parkinson disease. This activity is reported to be the result of its ubiquityl ligase activity which may be associated with the I93M pathogenic mutation in the gene.

Most recently, UCH-L1 has been demonstrated to interact with the E3 ligase, parkin. Parkin has been demonstrated to bind and ubiquitinylate UCH-L1 to promote lysosomal degradation of UCH-L1.

See also 

 Ubiquitin carboxyl-terminal esterase L3—the gene UCHL3
 Alpha synuclein
 Parkinson disease
 Proteasome

References

Further reading

External links 
 
 

EC 3.1.2
Molecular neuroscience